The 2017 Big South Conference football season will begin on Thursday, August 31 and conclude in December with the 2018 NCAA Division I Football Championship.

Head coaches

Regular season

All times Eastern time (UTC-4 before November 5, UTC-5 from November 5 forward).

Week One

Week Two

Week Three

Week Four

Week Five

Week Six

Week Seven

Week Eight

Week Nine

Week Ten

Week Eleven

Week Twelve

Attendance

References